The Battle of San Pedro was a battle of the Cuban War of Independence that took place on December 7, 1896 within the vicinity of the farm of the same name. The battle occurred near the town of Punta Brava on the outskirts of Marianao, La Habana Province.

Background
The third war for the independence of Cuba broke out in the spring of 1895. After several months organizing and strengthening, the Cuban independence forces determined the creation of an invading contingent that was to extend the war to the end of the island.

In October of that year, the Cuban Liberation Army left Mangos de Baraguá, in eastern Cuba, made up of several thousand poorly armed men and led by Major Generals Máximo Gómez and Antonio Maceo. In January 1896, the liberating troops reached the extreme end of the province of Pinar del Río, in the west of the country.

Having achieved his mission, General Gómez took a part of the troops that had participated in the invasion and marched in the opposite direction, leaving General Maceo with the rest of the men to carry out new military actions in Pinar del Río. During that year, both Cuban generals obtained important victories in their respective campaigns.

General Maceo, extremely concerned about this situation, hurriedly marched towards the East of the country, leaving Pinar del Río and entering La Habana Province, with the intention of continuing to cross the rest of the island to reach the eastern end, where there was the Cuban independence government.

Finding themselves in Havana territory, Maceo and his men reached the farm of San Pedro, very close to the town of Punta Brava, on the outskirts of Marianao, a small city near the country's capital, Havana in order to give a humiliating twist for Valeriano Weyler.

The battle
Around noon, colonel Juan Delgado González reported the first signs of Spanish soldiers beginning to arrive and Maceo sent a search party under the command of José Miró Argenter known as the Peral Guerrilla which was pursued by 365 Spanish soldiers and 24 Cubans from the Punta Brava Guerrilla while Maceo made the critical error of deciding to take a nap at his hammock while the search party couldn't locate the Spanish forces.

At 3 P.M., the Spanish soldiers ambushed the Cuban camp as the infantry swept through the sentries and reached to the center of the camp. The Spanish retreated to the stone fences as the remaining Mambises regrouped for a final stand.

After being woken up, Maceo gathered up 45 veterans from the previous Cuban Independence Campaigns and assessed the situation as the Mambises took to the offensive. During the charge, a chain-link fence got in the way and Maceo himself offered to cut it down but as he was doing so, gunfire from the stone walls shot Maceo in the face and the neck. He remained on his horse for a few seconds before losing consciousness and eventually, passing away. The death of Maceo destroyed any remaining morale for the remaining Mambises as they abandoned their positions and retreated, giving the Spanish the victory.

Aftermath
With the death of Antonio Maceo, the Cubans lost one of their best generals, which meant a significant weakening for the Mambíses and a certain demoralization among the troops. 

Personally, General Máximo Gómez lost his most beloved son, Panchito Gómez Toro and his best friend in the same battle, which was expressed in a certain pessimism of Gómez on the following day with the following:

However, despite these losses, the war continued until 1898 and ended with Cuban victory, with the help of the United States.

References

Bibliography
Dr. Ordaz Callejón, Eduardo. Ing. Ríos González, Omar. "Catauro Bautense"
History of the town of Bauta. Hoyo Colorado; Baldomero Acosta's Diary (unpublished)
My Diary of War by Bernabé Boza
Papeles de Maceo, Academy of Cuban History
Antonio Maceo: Notes for a history of his life, Volume III, Editora "Ciencias Sociales", 1989, by: José L. Franco

Conflicts in 1896
Battles involving Spain
Spanish colonial period of Cuba
December 1896 events
Battles involving Cuba